Lynchburg is a toponym that may refer to:
Lynchburg, California
Lynchburg, Mississippi
Lynchburg, Missouri
Lynchburg, North Dakota
Lynchburg, Ohio (in Clinton and Highland counties)
Lynchburg, Columbiana County, Ohio
Lynchburg, South Carolina
Lynchburg, Tennessee
Lynchburg, Texas
Lynchburg, Virginia, the largest US city named Lynchburg
Lynchburg Hillcats, minor-league baseball team

See also